Lachnaea is a genus of flowering plants in the family Thymelaeaceae, found in the Cape Floristic Region of southern South Africa. They tend to be small ericoid shrubs.

Species
Currently accepted species include:

Lachnaea alpina Meisn.
Lachnaea aurea Eckl. & Zeyh. ex Meisn.
Lachnaea axillaris Meisn.
Lachnaea burchellii Meisn.
Lachnaea capitata (L.) Crantz
Lachnaea densiflora Meisn.
Lachnaea diosmoides Meisn.
Lachnaea elsieae Beyers
Lachnaea ericoides Meisn.
Lachnaea eriocephala L.
Lachnaea filamentosa Meisn.
Lachnaea filicaulis (Meisn.) Beyers
Lachnaea funicaulis Schinz
Lachnaea globulifera Meisn.
Lachnaea glomerata Fourc.
Lachnaea gracilis Meisn.
Lachnaea grandiflora (L.f.) Baill.
Lachnaea greytonensis Beyers
Lachnaea laniflora (C.H.Wright) Bond
Lachnaea laxa (C.H.Wright) Beyers
Lachnaea leipoldtii Beyers
Lachnaea macrantha Meisn.
Lachnaea marlothii Schltr.
Lachnaea montana Beyers
Lachnaea naviculifolia Compton
Lachnaea nervosa (Thunb.) Meisn.
Lachnaea oliverorum Beyers
Lachnaea pedicellata Beyers
Lachnaea pendula Beyers
Lachnaea penicillata Meisn.
Lachnaea pomposa Beyers
Lachnaea pudens Beyers
Lachnaea pusilla Beyers
Lachnaea rupestris Beyers
Lachnaea ruscifolia Compton
Lachnaea sociorum Beyers
Lachnaea stokoei Beyers
Lachnaea striata (Lam.) Meisn.
Lachnaea uniflora (L.) Crantz
Lachnaea villosa Beyers

References

Thymelaeaceae
Malvales genera